is a Japanese voice actress from Tokyo. She is affiliated with Kenyu Office. She was regular on the Animate Pia Channel, which was broadcast on Nico Nico. Her major roles include Hajime Shinoda in New Game!, Kiitan in Etotama and Yuzu Iizuka in Sakura Trick. As part of the Etotama cast, she sang on the theme song under the group Soruaru BOB on a single called "blue moment" that reached number 49 on the Oricon charts. She also sang the theme songs for New Game! under the group forfolium; the singles "Sakura" and "Now Loading!!" reached numbers 33 and 42 on Oricon. As part of the Idolmaster cast, she sang on one of the singles which reached number 22.

Filmography

Anime

Films

Video games

References

External links
 Official agency profile 
 

1990 births
Living people
Japanese video game actresses
Japanese voice actresses
Voice actresses from Tokyo
21st-century Japanese actresses